Murder Bridge Hill is a mountain in Greene County, New York. It is located in the Catskill Mountains northeast of Greenville Center. King Hill is located south-southeast of Murder Bridge Hill.

References

Mountains of Greene County, New York
Mountains of New York (state)